34th parallel may refer to:

34th parallel north, a circle of latitude in the Northern Hemisphere
34th parallel south, a circle of latitude in the Southern Hemisphere